Mei Joni (born 7 May 1989) is an Indonesian professional basketball player for West Bandits Solo of the Indonesian Basketball League.

Club career
Mei Joni formerly played for Amartha Hangtuah and Stapac Jakarta.

In December 2020, Mei Joni joined the Indonesian Basketball League's newcomer club West Bandits Solo.

National team
Mei Joni has been a member of the Indonesian national basketball team, which he served as team captain.

Player profile
Jap Ricky Lesmana, head coach at the West Bandits, stated that he values Mei Joni's defense and shooting ability.

Career statistics

NBL/IBL

Regular season

Playoffs

References

External links
Indonesian Basketball League (IBL) Profile 
FIBA profile
Profile at Eurobasket.com
Profile at RealGM.com

1989 births
Living people
Indonesian men's basketball players
Shooting guards